"Lose You" is a song by Dutch disc jockey and producer Tiësto with vocals from Swiss-Albanian singer and songwriter ILIRA. The song was included in Tiësto's fifth studio album, The London Sessions, released on 15 May 2020. It is the third brazilian bass song produced by Tiësto after "Boom" and "Grapevine".

Track listing 
Digital Download (from The London Sessions album)
 "Lose You" - 2:30

 Digital download - Chico Rose Remix
 "Lose You" (Chico Rose Remix) - 2:35

Charts

References

2020 songs
Tiësto songs
Songs written by Tiësto